Amphisbaena hastata is a worm lizard species in the genus Amphisbaena.

Etymology
The specific name, hastata, is Latin for "spear-shaped".

Geographic range
It is found in Brazil in the state of Bahia.

See also
 List of reptiles of Brazil

References

Further reading
Vanzolini, P.E. 1991. Two new small species of Amphisbaena from the fossil dune field of the middle Rio São Francisco, State of Bahia, Brasil (Reptilia, Amphisbaenidae). Papéis Avulsos de Zoologia, Museu de Zoologia da Universidade de São Paulo 37 (17): 259–276.

External links

hastata
Taxa named by Paulo Vanzolini
Reptiles described in 1991